Kassina somalica, sometimes known as the Somali running frog, is a species of frog in the family Hyperoliidae. It is found in Eritrea, southern and eastern Ethiopia as well as the Rift Valley, Somalia, eastern Kenya, and northern Tanzania.
Its natural habitats are arid savannas. It probably breeds in both permanent and temporary bodies of water. It could be threatened by the expanding human population and the associated increases in the populations of domestic livestock. It occurs in a number of protected areas, including the Tsavo East and Tsavo West National Parks.

References

somalica
Frogs of Africa
Vertebrates of Eritrea
Amphibians of Ethiopia
Amphibians of Kenya
Amphibians of Somalia
Amphibians of Tanzania
Amphibians described in 1932
Taxa named by Giuseppe Scortecci
Taxonomy articles created by Polbot